Ayumi Hamasaki Countdown Live 2004–2005 A is a DVD issued by Japanese singer Ayumi Hamasaki. It is well-known for its performance of Trauma in which Hamasaki forgets the lyrics.

Track listing
 Whatever
 Immature
 Fly High
 Duty
 M
 Carols
 Evolution
 Flower Garden
 Audience
 Independent
 Trauma
 Inspire

Encore
 Walking Proud
 To Be
 Key: Eternal Tie ver.
 Humming 7/4
 Boys & Girls
 Winding Road

Ayumi Hamasaki video albums
2005 video albums
Live video albums
2005 live albums
Albums recorded at the Yoyogi National Gymnasium